is a former Japanese football player.

Career
Nobuhiro Uetani joined J1 League club Vissel Kobe in 2008. He moved to S.League club Albirex Niigata Singapore.

References

1989 births
Living people
Association football people from Hyōgo Prefecture
Japanese footballers
J1 League players
Vissel Kobe players
Association football forwards